Dharma-dharmatā-vibhāga (Distinguishing Phenomena and Pure Being) is a short Yogācāra work, attributed to Maitreya-nātha, which discusses the distinction and correlation (vibhāga) between phenomena (dharma) and reality (dharmatā); the work exists in both a prose and a verse version and survives only in Tibetan translation.  However, the Sanskrit original was reported to exist in Tibet during the 1930s by the Indian Buddhologist and explorer, Rahul Sankrityayan.

In English translation
The Dharmadharmata-vibhaga was translated into English by Jim Scott in 2004

References

Mahayana texts
Tibetan Buddhist texts
Yogacara